Orangism, with supporters known as Orangists, may refer to one of several political movements:

Orangism (Dutch Republic), a loosely defined current in support of a mixed constitution (until 1795)
Orangism (Kingdom of the Netherlands), a liberal-monarchist trend (starting 1860s)
Orangism (Belgium), supported the re-unification of Belgium and the Netherlands in a United Kingdom
Orangism (Luxembourg), supported the personal union of the Netherlands and the grand-duchy of Luxembourg
Orangism (Northern Ireland), whose followers are more usually known as Orangemen